Grégory Meilhac (born 5 September 1971) is a retired French football striker.

References

1971 births
Living people
French footballers
Nîmes Olympique players
Grenoble Foot 38 players
K.R.C. Zuid-West-Vlaanderen players
Association football forwards
Ligue 1 players
Belgian Pro League players
French expatriate footballers
Expatriate footballers in Belgium
French expatriate sportspeople in Belgium